Apa Neagră may refer to the following places in Romania:

 Apa Neagră, a village in Padeș Commune, Gorj County
 Apa Neagră, a tributary of the river Zeletin in Bacău County

See also 
 Neagra (disambiguation)
 Valea Neagră River (disambiguation)